William Brown McKinley (September 5, 1856December 7, 1926) was a U.S. Representative (1905–1913, 1915–1921) and United States Senator (1921–1926) from the State of Illinois. A member of the Republican Party, he was born near Petersburg, Illinois.

Biography
After attending the University of Illinois at Urbana-Champaign for two years, in around 1875 McKinley worked as a drug-store clerk in Springfield. He soon returned to Champaign to become a banker, specializing in farm mortgages. He entered politics in 1902, being elected a trustee of the University of Illinois. McKinley ran for the U.S. House of Representatives in 1904, winning his first of four consecutive terms. He lost re-election to the House in 1912. His re-election loss coincided with his service as national campaign manager for incumbent President William H. Taft, who also lost in 1912.

Voters in 1914 returned McKinley to the U.S. House, where he served from 1915 until 1921. In 1920, McKinley was elected to the U.S. Senate, taking office in 1921. In 1926, he ran for re-election and lost to Frank L. Smith (who ultimately was denied the seat by the Senate on the grounds of fraud and corruption in his campaign).

McKinley also was chief executive of the Illinois Traction System, an interurban electric railway. The McKinley Bridge between Venice, Illinois and St. Louis, Missouri was named for him. The McKinley Health Center at the University of Illinois at Urbana-Champaign is also named for him. McKinley died aged 70 in Martinsville, Indiana.

See also
List of United States Congress members who died in office (1900–49)

References

External links
 

 

1856 births
1926 deaths
American people of Scottish descent
People from Petersburg, Illinois
Businesspeople from Illinois
Politicians from Springfield, Illinois
University of Illinois Urbana-Champaign alumni
Republican Party United States senators from Illinois
Republican Party members of the United States House of Representatives from Illinois
20th-century American railroad executives